Lisa Schack Iversen (born 21 June 1997) is an Italian badminton player. She won her first senior international title at the 2016 Ethiopia International tournament in the women's doubles event partnered with Silvia Garino. Played for the Italian Air Force team, she claimed the women's doubles National Championships title in 2017 with Garino.

Achievements

BWF International Challenge/Series (2 titles, 3 runners-up) 
Women's singles

Women's doubles

  BWF International Challenge tournament
  BWF International Series tournament
  BWF Future Series tournament

External links

References 

1997 births
Living people
Sportspeople from Milan
Italian female badminton players
Competitors at the 2018 Mediterranean Games
Mediterranean Games competitors for Italy
Badminton players at the 2019 European Games
European Games competitors for Italy